This Morning is a British daytime magazine programme that is broadcast on ITV. It debuted on 3 October, 1988 and is broadcast live every weekday from 10:00am to 12:30pm across the United Kingdom and Republic of Ireland. The programme features a variety of news, showbiz, fashion, beauty, lifestyle, home and garden, food, tech, live phone ins, competitions and more.

The programme is broadcast on ITV1, STV or UTV (depending on ITV region) across the British Islands and on Virgin Media One in the Republic of Ireland. Catch up is available on ITVX and STV Player.

The show was originally presented by husband and wife duo Richard Madeley and Judy Finnigan for more than a decade after its launch. It is currently presented by Phillip Schofield and Holly Willoughby from Monday to Thursday, with Alison Hammond and Dermot O'Leary on Fridays. 

The daytime programme has aired on ITV since its inception, making it one of the longest-running daytime programmes on British television. It regularly wins at the National Television Awards and the TV Choice Awards.

History
In 1988, ITV decided to create a live daytime morning programme and five regional ITV companies made pilot shows to bid for the national contract:
 Television South offered a show called Home Today, hosted by Andy Craig and Fern Britton.
 Thames Television
 Yorkshire Television
 Tyne Tees Television
 Granada Television offered a show called This Morning, and was awarded the national contract.

The first episode of This Morning aired at 10:40 am on 3 October 1988 and finished at 12:10 pm, live from the Granada studio inside the Albert Dock in Liverpool. An industry insider believed the idea would not work and would be pulled by Christmas 1988, but despite This Morning being launched with no publicity, its ratings quickly rose to a daily average of two million viewers.

In the first few series', the show's "experts" were weatherman Fred Talbot, agony aunt Denise Robertson, medic Dr Chris Steele, cook Susan Brookes, beauty presenter Liz Earle, hair and make-up artists Andrew and Liz Collinge, and wine expert Charles Metcalfe. The theme tune was by David Pringle, who also wrote opening music for Wheel of Fortune, Fun House and The Pyramid Game. To end the first series, in 1989, the show was presented via satellite from the United States at Disneyland in Anaheim, California. Produced by Granada's Field Producer, Brian Thomas, the set was built directly in front of 'Sleeping Beauty Castle', a first for Disney.

As part of the show, weather presenter Fred Talbot used a floating map of the British Isles to report the forecast. A clip of Mark Roberts, a prolific streaker, running onto Talbot's weather map in 1995 is regularly featured on clip shows.

In 1996, the show was moved to the London Studios on the grounds that it was difficult to get celebrity guests to travel from London to Liverpool. In the summer of 2001, Madeley and Finnigan left This Morning to present their own series on Channel 4.

The show proved newsworthy on several occasions. In 2001 This Morning covered new ground by showing a gay partnership celebration live, and a 2008 interview with Kerry Katona slurring her words also attracted coverage.

2009–2015
ITV relaunched This Morning in 2009 with a new set and with Holly Willoughby replacing Fern Britton as co-host, which saw ratings rise by 20%.

This Morning Cook In!, an interactive cook event, began on 1 March 2010. Each week, five viewers and a celebrity guest cooked along, via Skype, with Gino D'Acampo or Phil Vickery.

From 20 March 2010, This Morning increased from five to seven shows a week, with two new one-hour shows broadcast on the weekends, where Schofield and Willoughby presented pre-recorded links in between compilations of the week's programming. The weekend editions were later dropped from the schedule.

The 'Hub' interactive segment was heavily featured from 2010 until 2014. Presenters included Jeff Brazier (2013–14), Jenni Falconer (2013–14), Stephen Mulhern (2011–2014) Rylan Clark (2013–14), Emma Willis (2012–2014), Coleen Nolan (2010–2012), Samanthi Jayawardena (2010–2012) and Matt Johnson (2010–2013).

On 21 August 2013, Carol Vorderman took her first steps towards a 2014 World Record attempt by doing a solo flight to 1,000 metres high, live on This Morning. Reporter Jenni Falconer covered the occasion.

On 3 October 2013, This Morning celebrated its 25th anniversary. The programme was broadcast live from its original home at Albert Dock in Liverpool with presenters Phillip Schofield, Eamonn Holmes, Holly Willoughby, Alison Hammond and Ruth Langsford being joined by original presenters Richard Madeley and Judy Finnigan. Numerous historical clips of the show were aired, including Gene Pitney's miming gaffe from 1989. Keith Lemon presented the weather from the show's famous floating weather map, while Stephen Mulhern presented various items including 'The Hub Sub' (the 'Hub' on a submarine). There was speculation concerning whether Fern Britton would return for the 25th anniversary; however, it was confirmed eight days beforehand that she would not.

2015–2018
On 27 August 2015, This Morning broadcast the remaining weeks' shows from the South Bank due to the main studio having a revamp ready for the new series on 1 September. The new series had many changes, including a brand new set, theme music, titles and the new logo being painted onto the outside of the building.

In February 2017, it was announced that The London Studios, where This Morning is filmed, were planned to close for large-scale redevelopment in early 2018, and that This Morning would be relocated to Television Centre during construction. This move became permanent when ITV announced its intention to sell The London Studios in October 2018.

In July 2017, at the start of the summer series, new titles were made to match Langsford and Holmes presenting the show. The titles were different from the usual design, showing a behind-the-scenes look from the doors to the studio, make-up props and room, clothing department and the art gallery with a view of the studio at fast speed with crew in the presenters' place. The show was also retitled This Morning with Eamonn and Ruth. The regular series titles used since 2015 returned on 4 September, when Willoughby and Schofield returned to the show.

2018–present
From 1 to 5 October 2018, This Morning celebrated 30 years on air. During the week, it broadcast a live wedding, a brief come-back of the classic weather map from Albert Dock (presented by Alison Hammond), special opening titles, a new app, a live studio audience, a special 30 years bus (with correspondents Lisa Snowdon and Ore Oduba), as well as special games and guests. On 2 October, an ITV special aired, entitled This Morning: 30 Unforgettable Years. On 12 October, the show aired live coverage of the wedding of Princess Eugenie and Jack Brooksbank.

From 6 January 2020, an extra 30 minutes were added onto the show following a live handover from Lorraine, which sees the show start at the earlier time of 10:00am as part of a changes to the ITV Daytime schedule. In November 2020, it was announced that Holmes and Langsford would no longer do a weekly slot and would be replaced by Alison Hammond and Dermot O'Leary. They took over the slot in January 2021.

Presenters
From October 1988 to July 2001, This Morning was presented by husband and wife Richard Madeley and Judy Finnigan. From 1998 onwards, they hosted only the Monday to Thursday editions, with regular guest presenters hosting on Fridays: during the tenth series Caron Keating and Ross Kelly presided, and from series 11 in 1999 Fern Britton and John Leslie were regular presenters of the Friday show. When Madeley and Finnigan left the show in 2001, they were replaced by Coleen Nolan and Twiggy, with Fern Britton and John Leslie remaining on Fridays. However, Nolan and Twiggy proved less popular with viewers: Twiggy was later axed, whilst Nolan presented until the end of 2001 with Leslie, and was subsequently replaced by Britton.

In October 2002, after television presenter Matthew Wright named John Leslie on The Wright Stuff as the man who allegedly raped Ulrika Jonsson, Leslie's contract on This Morning was terminated. Ulrika Jonsson had written in her autobiography that "an acquaintance" had raped her when she was 19. Leslie was replaced by Phillip Schofield.

In 2003, Alison Hammond joined the "This Morning" team as a regular segment presenter and announcer. In 2006, Ruth Langsford, who had been a guest presenter since 1999, and Eamonn Holmes became main presenters on Fridays and half terms.

On 26 March 2009, Fern Britton announced that she was to leave This Morning, and would be replaced by Holly Willoughby on 14 September 2009. Britton's final show was presented after 10 years on 17 July 2009.

In August 2013, Rochelle Humes and her husband Marvin Humes joined This Morning as regular stand-in presenters. They no longer appear together however since 2018, Humes has guest hosted the show on a number of occasions alongside a co-star. Humes also appeared as a regular host on the show alongside Phillip Schofield for a short period between November and December 2018, filling in for Schofield's co-star Holly Willoughby during her stint on I'm a Celebrity...Get Me Out of Here!. She also hosts the program in the absence of Holly Willoughby on a regular basis and is a main host in the absence of other presenters. 

In 2018, Josie Gibson joined the This Morning team as a regular segment presenter and announcer. In 2021, she became a regular stand-in presenter of the show, hosting in the absence of main presenters. 

In December 2020, it was announced that Holmes and Langsford were being replaced on Fridays by Alison Hammond and Dermot O'Leary, and would move to a school and bank holiday presenting slot. This change came into place in 2021. In December 2021, Holmes announced he was leaving This Morning and would be moving to GB News.

In an episode of Loose Women, it was confirmed that Ruth Langsford is the longest-serving This Morning presenter, having first joined the show in 1999.

In 2021, Vernon Kay joined the This Morning team as regular stand-in presenter in the absence of the main hosts, presenting alongside Rochelle Humes and Josie Gibson for the first time over the Christmas break for Holly Willoughby and Phillip Schofield.

On the 7 July 2022, This Morning announced a host of new presenters taking the reins while Holly and Philip take their regular summer break. 

The new hosts will include regular Friday presenters Alison Hammond and Dermot O'Leary, as well as Ruth Langsford, Josie Gibson, Rochelle Humes, Vernon Kay, Rylan Clark, Craig Doyle, Mollie King and Andi Peters.

Alison and Dermot will kick off the summer months by hosting the first two weeks. After that, there will be a mix of onscreen partnerships as follows: Josie and Craig, Rochelle and Andi, Josie and Vernon, Rochelle and Craig, Mollie and Craig, and Ruth and Rylan. Rochelle and Vernon will take the reins for the remaining shows before Phillip and Holly's comeback on 5 September.

On 22 August, Ruth Langsford returned to This Morning to present for the first time in nearly a year. Rylan presented alongside her.

On 29 August, Vernon Kay returned to present This Morning for the last week of the summer holidays. Rochelle presented alongside him. 

On 12 December the Christmas Holidays began with Alison & Dermot presenting all week (12th-16th). From the week beginning the 19th Craig Doyle & Josie Gibson presented.

Phillip & Holly presented a special edition of the programme at Christmas Day from 10am to 12pm.

Controversies

Classism: 'It's a Toff Life' 
In 2018, viewers and commentators criticised a segment titled 'It's A Toff Life.' Instalments set a series of challenge for former Made in Chelsea cast member Georgia 'Toff' Toffolo that included completing tasks required of staff in KFC and a sewage works. Viewers deemed the segment "pathetically patronising" to watch Toffolo "slum it like ordinary folk for the day" and claimed the show was 'patronising working class people.'

Boris Johnson selfie 
In December 2019, during the 2019 United Kingdom general election, Philip Schofield and Holly Willoughby were criticised for a "giggly" interview with then Prime Minister Boris Johnson. The co-hosts' decision to take a 'selfie' with the British politician was also criticised, and viewers raised a "lack of professionalism" and "clear bias." Schofield defended the stunt writing: "Can I point out that if Mr Corbyn had asked for a selfie, we would have happily obliged." Viewers argued that the pair had been more critical when interviewing then leader of the Labour Party Jeremy Corbyn who faced repeated calls to apologise for accusations of antisemitism in the party. Viewers noted that Islamophobia in the Conservative Party was not raised with Johnson. Ofcom received 149 complaints.

Energy bills 
On 5 September 2022, This Morning included a new prize of 'energy bills' in their regular 'spin to win' game. The prize equated to four months of payments, up to £400 each month. When a contestant failed to provide the qualifying passcode on air This Morning ended the phone call prompting presenter Holly Willoughby to say, "Well, we're not going to make Joyce's dreams come true." Co-host Philip Schofield replied, "Well it's her fault." Schofield asked the first qualifying contestant if they were "worried" about energy bills and the contestant replied that "it's absolutely murder" having a prepayment meter. The inclusion of bill payments was compared to Black Mirror or The Hunger Games. Coverage from Sky News asked "Is Russia using Phillip Schofield for propaganda?" after the game was reported on Russian state television. British politician Mary Kelly Foy tweeted:I'm disgusted that @thismorning have used people being unable to afford their energy bills as some kind of twisted gameshow. The producers need to rethink this immediately! Everyone deserves dignity, especially if they're struggling.On 6 September 2022, Philip Schofield referenced the controversy by saying, "I wonder how much of that they can complain about online." Ofcom received 170 complaints about the segment and it prompted widespread criticism from viewers and commentators. Ofcom's broadcasting code states that: "We would strongly advise broadcasters not to present a monetary prize as a possible resolution of financial difficulty." On 7 September 2022, the prize was removed without comment from ITV.

'Jumping The Queue' controversy 
Both of the shows' presenters Holly Willlougby and Phillip Schofield attracted controversy on 16 September 2022 after reportedly 'jumping the queue' at Westminster Hall  to gain quicker and easier access entry to the lying in state ceremony for HM Queen Elizabeth II who died on 8 September 2022. However the programme makers denied the accusations stating both Willoughby and Schofield were there in a 'professional capacity as accredited journalists to cover the event'.

Ratings
The show typically receives 1 million viewers daily. On 3 October 2018, the show had one of its highest ratings, when 2.7 million viewers tuned in for its 30th anniversary.

Studio

From 1996 to April 2018, This Morning broadcast live from Studio 8 at The London Studios on the South Bank, which features large picture windows looking out over the River Thames. Coinciding with the programme's revamp, the outside of the studio was repainted with the new This Morning logo and branding.

Since 16 April 2018, This Morning has been broadcast from Studio 3 of the newly renovated Television Centre run by BBC Studioworks, along with the rest of ITV Daytime, including Loose Women, Lorraine and Good Morning Britain.

It was planned to move back to the studios in 2023, but in October 2018, ITV announced it was looking to sell the site and would continue with the current studios and offices longer term. In November 2019, the original studio of This Morning was sold to Mitsubishi Estate.

Awards
This Morning has won the National Television Award for Best Daytime/Live Magazine Show for 18 years running, from 1998 to 2021.

References

External links
 
 

1988 British television series debuts
1980s British television series
1990s British television series
2000s British television series
2010s British television series
2020s British television series
English-language television shows
Television series by ITV Studios
Television shows produced by Granada Television